Roaring Run (also known as Roaring Creek) is a tributary of Bowman Creek in Wyoming County, Pennsylvania, in the United States. It has two named tributaries: Newton Run and South Branch Roaring Run. It is designated as a High-Quality Coldwater Fishery and a Migratory Fishery and the stream is Class A Wild Trout Waters. The surficial geology in its vicinity consists of alluvium, alluvial terrace, alluvial fan, bedrock, Wisconsinan Till, and Wisconsinan Ice-Contact Stratified Drift. A bridge carrying Pennsylvania Route 29 crosses the stream.

Course

Roaring Run begins in a deep valley on Forkston Mountain in Forkston Township. It flows south through its valley for several tenths of a mile before turning south-southeast. The stream continues flowing through its deep valley in this direction for more than a mile before receiving South Branch Roaring Run, its first named tributary, from the right. Its valley then broadens slightly and it turns southeast for several tenths of a mile before entering Noxen Township. Here, the stream turns east-northeast for a short distance before east-southeast and receiving the tributary Newton Run from the left. The creek then leaves its valley and turns southeast for several hundred feet before turning south. A few tenths of a mile further downstream, it crosses Pennsylvania Route 29 and reaches its confluence with Bowman Creek.

Tributaries
Roaring Run has two named tributaries: Newton Run and South Branch Roaring Run.

Hydrology

Geography and geology

In its lower reaches, Roaring Run flows through a band where the surficial geology consists of alluvium. This area is flanked by areas with a surficial geology consisting of alluvial terrace and alluvial fan. Further upstream, the alluvium continues and is flanked by alluvial fan, Wisconsinan Ice-Contact Stratified Drift, Wisconsinan Till, and bedrock consisting of sandstone and shale. The surficial geology near the stream's headwaters features Wisconsinan Till and bedrock.

In the Holocene Period, sediment from Roaring Run has forced Bowman Creek's channel to remain on the south side of its valley.

Watershed
The stream is entirely within the United States Geological Survey quadrangle of Noxen.

The entire length of Roaring Run is on private land that is closed to access. The stream is located in the vicinity of the community of Noxen.

Roaring Run is one of the major tributaries of Bowman Creek.

History
Roaring Run was entered into the Geographic Names Information System on August 2, 1979. Its identifier in the Geographic Names Information System is 1199392. The stream is also known as Roaring Creek.

In 1880, a portable steam mill was being erected on Roaring Run.

A concrete tee beam bridge carrying Pennsylvania Route 29 over Roaring Run was built in 1939.

The channel of Roaring Run has experienced damage during flooding on January 25, 2010. However, the Wyoming County Conservation District received a $125,000 grant from the Pennsylvania Department of Environmental Protection to repair it and four other stream channels in the area.

Biology
The drainage basin of Roaring Run is designated as a High-Quality Coldwater Fishery and a Migratory Fishery. Wild trout naturally reproduce in the stream from its headwaters downstream to its mouth.

Roaring Run is the only wild brook trout/rainbow trout fishery in Pennsylvania.

See also
 Marsh Creek (Bowman Creek), next tributary of Bowman Creek going downstream
 Leonard Creek, next tributary of Bowman Creek going upstream
 List of rivers of Pennsylvania
 List of tributaries of Bowman Creek

References

Rivers of Wyoming County, Pennsylvania
Tributaries of Bowman Creek
Rivers of Pennsylvania